Anthony J. Opachen (October 18, 1909 – May 4, 1966) was an American politician and laborer.

Born in the Town of Hammel, Taylor County, Wisconsin, Opachen graduated from Medford High School in Medford, Wisconsin in 1927. He was a laborer and candy maker. Opachen served in the Wisconsin State Assembly in 1933 and was a Democrat. Opachen was killed in Milwaukee, Wisconsin when he was struck by a car near the downtown area, He was 56 years old.

Notes

External links

1909 births
1966 deaths
People from Taylor County, Wisconsin
Democratic Party members of the Wisconsin State Assembly
Road incident deaths in Wisconsin
20th-century American politicians
People from Medford, Wisconsin